Colin Todd Gerard Woodell (born December 20, 1991) is an American actor. He is known for his role as Rick Betancourt on The Purge on USA Network and Matias in the 2018 film Unfriended: Dark Web. He played Aiden in the CW series The Originals, Tyler Richmond on Designated Survivor, Ronald Sturgis on Masters of Sex (2013–2016), and Buckley on the HBO series The Flight Attendant (2020). Other film credits include Unsane, Searching, the Netflix original film XOXO, and The Call of the Wild.

On the stage, Woodell has appeared Off-Broadway in Second Stage Theater's 2019 production of Dying City by Christopher Shinn. In 2017, Woodell played the role of Edmund Tyrone in The Geffen Playhouse's production of Long Day's Journey Into Night in Los Angeles.

Education
Woodell attended St. Ignatius College Preparatory in San Francisco, and began his training and first professional theater performances at The American Conservatory Theater as a member of the Young Conservatory. He then moved to Los Angeles, where he studied at the School of Dramatic Arts at the University of Southern California, and obtained a Bachelor of Fine Arts in Theater.

Filmography

References

External links

Playbill interview

21st-century American male actors
Male actors from San Francisco
Living people
1991 births
USC School of Dramatic Arts alumni